The International Junior Art Festival (IJAF) is a youth festival which is held annually at Gyeongpo Beach in Gangneung, South Korea, for four days at the beginning of August. With 300 participants from seven nations and 500 visitors every night, it is considered the biggest international youth festival in South Korea.

Concept 
The IJAF aims at cultural exchange between youths from South Korea and other countries and at communicating Korean culture to the participants. The festival concept includes both performances of the participating groups in front of a large international audience and a diversified cultural programme: mask dances, paper artwork, taekwondo, museums and other workshops deliver insight into Korean culture.

Course of events 
The festival lasts four days. Each group performs twice: one performance on the main stage at Gyeongpo Beach, one performance on the sub stage next to the Gangneung Arts Hall in the city. The first evening starts with a big parade of all participants through the city towards the beach. The opening and closing ceremony includes a big fireworks at the beach. During festival days, the participating groups attend several cultural workshops. The festival is free of charge for the participating groups and entrance is free for the audience.

History 
In 2002, Mr Jeong, Tae-Hwan, founded the East Asia Junior Art Festival, aiming at cultural exchange between Asian youth groups. In 2004, a hip hop group and a horn quartet from Germany were invited. Since then, the festival has been continued as the International Junior Art Festival. Groups from the following countries have participated: Korea, Japan, China, Russia, Germany, USA, Taiwan, Mongolia, Indonesia, Latvia, Lithuania and Australia.

Partners 
The local section of the Federation of Artistic and Cultural Organization, a cultural organisation operating all over South Korea, is official host of the IJAF. Since 2009, it has been assisted by the Gangneung Culture and Arts Foundation. The organisation of the festival is the task of the Festival Committee, consisting of members of both partners. The festival is sponsored by Gangwon Province and Gangneung City. There are co-operations with the local KBS broadcast station, the KSGI Arts Council Korea and the Gangneung Danoje Festival Committee.

See also
List of festivals in South Korea
List of festivals in Asia

External links

 The official website 
 Federation of Artistic and Cultural Organization Gangneung
 Gangneung Culture and Arts Foundation

Summer festivals
Art festivals in South Korea
Gangneung
Tourist attractions in Gangneung
Youth organizations based in South Korea
Annual events in South Korea
Arts festivals in South Korea
Summer events in South Korea